Badli railway station is a small railway station in North Delhi district, NCT. Its code is BHD. It serves Badli and Rohini which is a residential and commercial neighborhood. The station consists of two platforms. The platforms are well sheltered. It lacks many facilities including water and sanitation.

Trains 
 New Delhi–Kurukshetra MEMU
 Lokmanya Tilak Terminus–Amritsar Express
 Delhi–Panipat Passenger
 Panipat–New Delhi MEMU
 Panipat–Ghaziabad MEMU
 Kurukshetra–Hazrat Nizamuddin MEMU
 New Delhi–Kurukshetra MEMU
 Delhi–Kalka Passenger
 Kurukshetra–Old Delhi MEMU
 Himachal Express

See also

 Hazrat Nizamuddin railway station
 New Delhi railway station
 Delhi Junction railway station
 Anand Vihar Railway Terminal
 Sarai Rohilla railway station
 Delhi Metro

References

Railway stations in North Delhi district
Delhi railway division